Wendy St. Kitts is a singer and songwriter. Hailing from the Caribbean in the federation of St. Kitts and Nevis (birthplace of Joan Armatrading). Going up, Wendy St. Kitts dreamed in rock and pop music although she was surrounded by Calypso. She cites Joan Armatrading, Adele, Coldplay, and Barbra Streisand as some of her influences.

Career beginnings

As a child Wendy St. Kitts spent her summers in New York City where she eventually relocated and struggled to build her music career. Man, it was as tough as it should be. Selling sex was and I guess is the thing to do, but that's just not me. So, like many others, I took the long, hard road of certified rejection and truly discovered who I was. Still the best thing I've ever done.

Albums

In 2004, Wendy self-released the LP Windy Road in her native country of St. Kitts-Nevis. Driven by the single "Don't Lie to Me", Wendy returned to St. Kitts for her first headlining concert in May 2004. In April 2008, St. Kitts released her first full-length professionally produced EP, Woman Empowered. Vocally, she moved from a roar to a whisper with ease. R. Hendix, Music Supervisor MTV New York City said of her: "Wendy has a big voice; a great voice. Her music is really big."   With Woman Empowered, the music inside reflected the journey and musical rebirth of a woman committed to transforming lives through her music and self-expression. VividNurban.com said about Wendy St. Kitts, "This songstress has a presence and a voice that is guaranteed to move the most rebellious of crowds just by the passion with which she delivers her material.".

In support of Woman Empowered, during 2008–2009, Wendy and her band embarked on a small tour throughout New York City and Washington D.C.

2010–2012

After the 2008 EP release, Wendy St. Kitts picked up the guitar and focused on growing as a songwriter. Wendy continued to write songs that reflected her musical voice and sound. In late 2011, she began performing her new songs at local pubs in the UK. About her music, Wendy says Songwriting is something I give myself. It is a ceaseless passion of which I'm grateful. When the music connects with people, it compels me to keep it honest and keep at it.

Wendy St. Kitts’ yet to be titled LP is scheduled for release in 2012.

Discography
Woman Empowered (New Road Entertainment, 2008)
Woman Empowered-the single (New Road Entertainment, 2008)

References

Reviews
WildysWorld – Woman Empowered / Wendy St. Kitts
Vivid Nurban –  Wendy St. Kitts / In the Studio
Wendy St. Kitts / URB Magazine
Wendy St. Kitts / Feminist Review
Chronic Magazine – Woman Empowered / Wendy St. Kitts

External links
 Wendy St. Kitts Official Facebook Page
  Wendy St. Kitts Official site
  Wendy St. Kitts performs "Should I Love Him or Walk Away"
 Wendy St. Kitts on Twitter

American soul singers
People from Queens, New York
Singers from Washington, D.C.
Year of birth missing (living people)
Living people
Saint Kitts and Nevis musicians
Saint Kitts and Nevis emigrants to the United States